The Thomson TO16 or Thomson TO16PC is a PC compatible personal computer introduced by French company Thomson SA in 1987, with prices ranging from 9000 to 16000 FF depending on the version.

Prototype
The original concept was a machine similar to the Macintosh. Based on this the Thomson TO16 prototype (codename Théodore) was built around a Motorola 68000 processor with an Intel 82716 graphics chipset. The operating system chosen was OS-9, a preemptive multitasking system similar to Unix. It also featured an integrated 20MB SCSI hard drive.

Work on the prototype was carried on between 1985 and 1988, with five machines built. This concept was abandoned in favor of a PC compatible architecture, with the TO16 model designation being kept.

Specifications 
Motorola 68000 @ 8Mhz CPU
2 MB RAM
Two video modes: 320x200 with 256 colors; 640x270 with 16 colors
Mouse 
3"1/2 floppy drive
20 MB SCSI hard drive

Thomson TO16
The Thomson TO16 is a IBM PC compatible machine, running MS-DOS 3.2 with MS-DOS Manager and GW-BASIC.
The CPU is an Intel 8088 capable of running at 9.54Mhz on turbo mode with 512KB of RAM and a CGA graphic card with expanded abilities.

Specifications 
CPU Intel 8088 running at 4.77 or 9.54 MHz
support for Intel 8087 co-processor 
512 KB of RAM, expandable to 768 KB on the motherboard.
32 KB of ROM
IBM Monochrome Display Adapter, Hercules Graphics Card, CGA and Plantronics Colorplus compatible graphic card
Internal 5"1/4 360 KB disc drive
Two ISA expansion slots 
Connections for an external disk drive
RS-232C Serie and Centronics Parallel (Micro ribbon connector) interfaces
Optional Modem

Hardware versions
The original TO16 model was expanded into four variations by adding extra hardware, such as a modem or hard drive.
Thomson TO16PC: original and most basic version
Thomson TO16PCM : 2400 bauds modem
Thomson TO16XPDD : two disc drives
Thomson TO16XPHD : 20 MB hard drive, color monitor and EGA graphics

References

IBM PC compatibles
Home computers
Thomson computers